DC Super Hero Girls is an American animated superhero television series developed by Lauren Faust and produced by Warner Bros. Animation for Cartoon Network. Based on the web series and franchise of the same name, the series premiered on March 8, 2019, with a one-hour special.

The series follows the adventures of teenage versions of Wonder Woman, Batgirl, Bumblebee, Supergirl, Green Lantern, and Zatanna who are students at Metropolis High School.

Premise

The show focuses on six female teenage superheroes with secret identities: Diana Prince / Wonder Woman (voiced by Grey Griffin); Barbara "Babs" Gordon / Batgirl (voiced by Tara Strong); Kara Danvers / Supergirl (voiced by Nicole Sullivan); Zee Zatara / Zatanna (voiced by Kari Wahlgren), Jessica Cruz / Green Lantern (voiced by Myrna Velasco); and Karen Beecher / Bumblebee (voiced by Kimberly Brooks). The six girls meet at Metropolis High School and form a superhero team dubbed the "Super Hero Girls".

The show tells the coming-of-age stories of the Super Hero Girls, dealing with their choices and decisions regarding their superhero identities and their secret identities. The show focuses on physical comedy, emotional storylines, and a large gallery of villains.

Episodes

The new incarnation of DC Super Hero Girls debuted at the 2018 San Diego Comic-Con with the theatrical short #TheLateBatsby which screened in theaters before the film Teen Titans Go! To the Movies. The online "Super Shorts" debuted on January 17, 2019 with #SuperSleeper on YouTube. The TV series debuted with the one-hour special #SweetJustice on March 8, 2019.

Production
Lauren Faust was approached by Warner Bros. to develop DC Super Hero Girls into a television series, after previously working on Super Best Friends Forever. The television iteration of the web series DC Super Hero Girls was announced in May 2017. Tara Strong and Nicole Sullivan reprise their roles as Batgirl and Supergirl respectively from Super Best Friends Forever, while Grey Griffin, who previously voiced Wonder Girl (Donna Troy) from the DC Nation Shorts, reprises her role as Wonder Woman from the web series. A year later, a poster showing the first look of the main characters was released. The series is animated by the Canadian studio Jam Filled Entertainment and Hasbro's Boulder Media from Ireland.

The writers chose to model each character and their personalities after a teenager archetype, while also drawing inspiration for several characters on their incarnations from the Silver Age of Comic Books. However, for the more modern Jessica Cruz, the writers heavily altered her characterization due to her original backstory contrasting heavily with the series' lighthearted tone.

Several of the writers for this series had previously worked on My Little Pony: Friendship Is Magic, another show created and developed by Faust. Also, her series is the second collaboration of Tara Strong and John de Lancie, who respectively voiced Twilight Sparkle and Discord on Friendship Is Magic.

Natalie Wetzig, a director on DC Super Hero Girls, referred to the second season of the show in an interview at the 2020 Annie Awards. She later clarified she stated the second half of season 1. Co-executive producer Amanda Rynda said the crew is "introducing lots of new villains and pushing the needle on new storylines" for season 2.

Broadcast
The show premiered on Cartoon Network UK on 6 July 2019. It began airing on CITV in September 2020. All 52 episodes of season 1 are available to watch on Netflix.

Video games

 DC Super Hero Girls Blitz — Budge Studios created a DC Super Hero Girls mobile game for Android and iOS devices which was released on August 8, 2019. It is a collection of microgames with difficulty-increasing-with-speed featuring the main heroines from the show, but some microgames needed to be bought separately each heroine to unlock those microgames.
 DC Super Hero Girls: Teen Power — A Nintendo Switch game published by Nintendo on June 4, 2021.

Reception 

The series received generally mixed to positive reviews from critics. Emily Ashby of Common Sense Media described the series as fast-paced, focusing on teen heroes who use teamwork, and noted that strong messages about "girl power and the value of friendship" within the series.

References

External links

2010s American animated television series
2010s American high school television series
2019 American television series debuts
2020s American animated television series
2020s American high school television series
2021 American television series endings
American children's animated action television series
American children's animated adventure television series
American children's animated comedy television series
American children's animated fantasy television series
American children's animated superhero television series
American children's animated supernatural television series
Animated Justice League television series
Animated superheroine television shows
Animated television shows based on DC Comics
Cartoon Network original programming
Child versions of cartoon characters
DC Super Hero Girls
English-language television shows
Teen animated television series
Teen superhero television series
Television series by Jam Filled Entertainment
Television series by Warner Bros. Animation
Television series created by Lauren Faust
Wonder Woman in other media